Ahmad Musa is a Qatari football midfielder who played for Qatar in the 2004 AFC Asian Cup.

References 

Living people
Qatari footballers
Qatar international footballers
Association football midfielders
Year of birth missing (living people)
Footballers at the 2002 Asian Games
Qatar Stars League players
Al-Wakrah SC players
Al-Rayyan SC players
Al-Sailiya SC players
Al Ahli SC (Doha) players
Asian Games competitors for Qatar
2004 AFC Asian Cup players